Huang Ruo (黃若, born 1976) is a Chinese-born composer, pianist and vocalist who now lives in the United States.

Biography

Born on Hainan Island off the southern coast of China in 1976, Huang was taught piano and composition from the age of six by his father, a well-known Chinese composer. When he was 12, he was admitted to the Shanghai Conservatory of Music where he was instructed in both traditional Chinese and western music by Deng Erbo. In 1995, after winning the Henry Mancini Award at the International Film and Music Festival in Switzerland, he continued his education in the United States at the Oberlin Conservatory of Music in Ohio and at the Juilliard School in New York City where he studied composition with Samuel Adler, receiving a doctorate.

In 2001, Huang was one of the founding members of the International Contemporary Ensemble, an orchestral group of some 30 musicians which often performs works by European, Latin American, and Asian composers. In 2005, he founded the performance company, Future in Reverse (FIRE), specializing in multimedia and cross-genre projects.

In 2010, Huang's composition "The Yellow Earth" won the Celebrate Asia! composition competition. It was performed by the Seattle Symphony at a concert in January 2011. The piece is a rearrangement of the third movement of his sheng concerto "The Color Yellow" which brings together music produced by a Chinese instrument accompanied by a Western orchestra.

In 2015-2016, Huang was the first composer-in-residence of The Concertgebouw.

Musical style

Huang Ruo's aesthetic neologism is his attempt to "define connections between space, time, and sound. It is related to architecture and modern art in general, which I am a big lover of."

Describing dimensionalism in detail Ruo writes,

Christina Mamakos, who has created an installation combining Huang's music with a video in June 2011, defines the technique he calls "dimensionalism." In aesthetic terms, she defines the term as "Using an inventive musical voice which draws equal inspiration from Chinese folk, western avant-garde, rock and jazz, Ruo creates a seamless series of musical works that do not necessarily exist in the sound world of our daily life."

Awards
First prize, International Composition Competition, Luxembourg, 2008 with "MO".
First prize, Celebrate Asia! composition competition, 2010 with "The Yellow Earth".

Selected works
Being..., for alto saxophone (or clarinet) and viola (1999)
Omnipresence, violin concerto (2003)
Tree Without Wind, (2004)
Leaving Sao, for Chinese folk vocalist and orchestra, (2004)
String Quartet No.1, The Three Tenses, (2005)
Four Fragments, for amplified violin (2006)
Wind Blows..., for viola and piano (2007)
The Color Yellow, concerto for sheng and fifteen musicians (2007)
Dr. Sun Yat-sen, opera, original version premiered 2011, revised version premiered 2014
An American Soldier, opera, original version premiered 2014, revised version premiered 2018
 Above the Drowning Sea, documentary, 2017, soundtrack composer.
 Blue Sky, video short, 2013, music by.
 Book of Mountain and Seas opera (2022)

Discography
Huang Ruo, "Chamber Concertos Nos 1 to 4", International Contemporary Ensemble, and Mandy Corrado, Naxos CD 8.559322 (2007)
Huang Ruo, "To The Four Corners", Huang Ruo (Composer), Huang Ruo (Conductor), Future In REverse (F.I.R.E.) (Performer), Stephen Buck (Performer), Min Xiao-Fen (Performer), Naxos CD
Huang Ruo: Drama Theater Nos. 2-4 / String Quartet No. 1, "The 3 Tenses" (Future In REverse, Huang Ruo), Naxos CD 8.559653
New Music from Bowling Green, Vol. 5, Jane Rodgers' Roger Schupp (Artist), Huang Ruo (Artist, Composer, Performer), Steven Bryant (Composer), Samuel Adler (Composer), Shulamit Ran (Composer), John Ross (Composer), Michael Daugherty (Composer), Emily Freeman Brown (Conductor), Bowling Green Philharmonia (Orchestra), Roger Schupp (Performer), Jane Rodgers (Performer), Albani CD (2008) 
International Composition Prize Luxembourg 2008, World Premiere Recordings, New Works for Solo-Sheng and Orchestra": Huang Ruo, "MO"; Lan-chee Lam, "Threnody for the Earth"; Kee Yong Chong, "Phoenix calling"; Xiaozhong Yang, "Horsetail Whisk II", Lok-yin Tang, "It is What it is!"; Stephen Yip, "Six Paths". Luxembourg Sinfonietta, Soloist: Wu Wei, Conductor: Marcel Wengler. CD LGNM No 408.

External links
Huang Ruo's website
Huang Ruo's page at Theodore Presser Company
Huang Ruo on his life and music - Interview on the 7th Avenue Project Radio Show

References

Chinese male composers
Chinese classical pianists
Chinese folk singers
Living people
1976 births
American musicians of Chinese descent
Shanghai Conservatory of Music alumni
Oberlin Conservatory of Music alumni
Juilliard School alumni
Singers from Hainan
Chinese emigrants to the United States
Chinese composers
People from Qionghai
Male classical pianists